Acanthoscelis ruficornis, Beach ground beetle is a species of ground beetle in the Scaritinae subfamily, the only species in the genus Acanthoscelis.

Description
Its head and thorax are wrinkled while its antennae is of the same colour as its tarsi. It also have front tibia which is broad and flattened.

Ecology
When it comes to feeding, A. ruficornis is a night predator. During that time he feeds on various species of Isopoda and Amphipoda as well as both adult and larva insects. It inhabits beaches where there is plenty of sand and hides under seaweeds.

References

Scaritinae